On 11 November 2014, a bus collided with a truck at the Theri Bypass, near Khairpur, Sindh, Pakistan, killing 56 people.

Accident
A bus was travelling from Swat District, Khyber Pakhtunkhwa to Karachi, Sindh, when it collided with a truck at the Theri Bypass (which connects the Khairpur and Sukkur Districts). The exact cause of the crash is not known. Initial reports by local media stated that the driver of the bus was trying to overtake another vehicle and rammed into a truck coming from the opposite side. However, according to a traffic police official, the bus was about to take to the road after getting fuel from a filling station when it hit a speeding truck. According to Ghulam Jhokhio, the cause of the accident was most likely because of heavy fog. Other reports state the bus driver fell asleep while driving and hit a driver headed the opposite direction. The death toll was 56: 18 children, 21 women and 17 men.

Aftermath

The injured were transported to Khairpur civil hospital for medical attention. Three of the injured were reported to be in critical condition.

Reaction
Chairman of Pakistan Tehreek-e-Insaf, Imran Khan offered condolences over the accident. President Mamnoon Hussain expressed grief over the accident. Sindh Province Governor Ishrat-ul-Ibad Khan expressed his condolences to the family members of the victims.

Controversy

This was the most high-profile accident in Pakistan. Initially the National Highway and Motorway Police officers blamed the National Highway Authority (NHA)for the terrible road condition as a major cause of the accident in unofficial television reports. A formal NH&MP police report from the SSPs office was filed a few days later which pinned a significant blame on National Highway Authority. Subsequently, a formal FIR was filed by the district Sindh Police SHO Afzal Khan Yousufzai implicating four NHA officers on an act of criminal negligence. Legal proceedings began in Sukkhur court.

The Commissioner Sukkhur also conducted a very detailed inquiry of the incident. His findings replicated the police findings to a major extent citing poor road condition and the presence of illegal U-turns, unmarked diversions, and an unmarked road hump on the road which caused the bus to topple over and veer into the northbound where it collided with an oncoming coal carrying truck.

The Federal Ombudsman of Pakistan also took notice of the issue and ordered its own inquiry on the matter. Significant time had passed since the accident, but the comprehensive inquiry was studied all previous inquiries on the accident and did groundwork study with the survivors, finally coming to the conclusion that the road hump played a role in toppling the bus and diverting it onto the oncoming traffic.

The National Highway Authority, led by Chairman Shahid Ashraf Tarrar and their legal expert Col(R) Azim challenged the findings in court. They claimed that the road hump had no role to play in the accident.

The issue was taken into the Parliament of Pakistan, and a forensic expert team was assigned the task through Ministry of Communication through its Parliamentary representative Mr. Alam Jan Laleka.

The Forensic team was led by Dr. Omer Masood Qureshi, Director of Automotive Design and safety lab at the Institute of Space Technology. The findings of this report studied the structure of the bus, suspension components, gauges, speedometers, brake pedals, gear shafts, under microscopic failure analysis techniques and determined that the bus did indeed overturn prior to the accident, However the suspension did not show any signs of pre collision damage prior to overturning. The leafs spring positions also did not indicate that the bus hit a road hump big enough to overturn the bus.

The road survey by Automotive Design and Safety lab team however, did indicate the presence of a road hump which was removed in the evening of 11 November 2014. Forensic scrutiny of EXIF data of photographs provided by both parties indicated that. However, some chips, chops and metallic grooves on the road indicated that the bus did not collide with the road hump, the driver of the bus turned the vehicle on an illegal diversion, misjudging the speed and the diversion, the vehicle came onto the northbound road where there was two way traffic. High CG due to overloading and a sharp left turn caused the vehicle to topple over at high speed and hit the oncoming overloaded truck.

The findings of the last report were accepted in the hearing by Wafaqi Mohtasib.

References

2014 disasters in Pakistan
2014 in Sindh
2014 road incidents
2010s road incidents in Asia
Bus incidents in Pakistan
Disasters in Sindh
2014 bus crash
November 2014 events in Pakistan